Express Metrix is a provider of IT asset management software used for PC hardware and software inventory, license management, and software metering. Express Metrix is based in Seattle, Washington, and its software has been deployed on more than two million desktop computers worldwide.

Company history
Express Metrix grew out of a division of WRQ, Inc. (now Attachmate) called Express Systems. In September 2000, a group of WRQ executives purchased the Express Systems product line from WRQ and formed Express Metrix.

Products
Express Software Manager is an IT asset management suite that integrates PC inventory, purchasing data, software usage tracking, and application control. The suite includes Express Inventory and Express Meter.
Express Inventory is a hardware and software inventory product that provides a summary of all hardware and software installed across the PC desktop and server environment.
Express Meter is a software metering product that allows companies to track software usage across their networks, as well as restrict access to applications that are concurrently licensed or pose a risk to security or productivity.

References

External links
 Express Metrix IT Asset Management Software

Software companies based in Seattle
Defunct software companies of the United States
2000 establishments in the United States
2000 establishments in Washington, D.C.
Software companies established in 2000
Companies established in 2000
Companies based in Seattle